Jim Mullen may also refer to:
Jim Mullen (born 1945) - Glasgow-born jazz guitarist.
Jim Mullen (baseball) (1883–1925) - American Major League Baseball player
Jim Mullen (businessman) (born 1970) - a British businessman